Chester Isaiah Long (October 12, 1860July 1, 1934) was a United States representative and Senator from Kansas. Born in Greenwood Township, Pennsylvania, he moved with his parents to Daviess County, Missouri, in 1865 and to Paola, Kansas, in 1879. He attended the country schools and graduated from the normal school at Paola in 1880. He taught school for several years, studied law, and was admitted to the bar in 1885, commencing practice in Medicine Lodge, Kansas.

He was a member of the Kansas Senate from 1889 to 1893 and was an unsuccessful candidate for election in 1892 to the Fifty-third Congress. He was elected as a Republican to the Fifty-fourth Congress, serving from March 4, 1895, to March 3, 1897; he was an unsuccessful candidate for reelection in 1896 to the Fifty-fifth Congress, but was elected to the Fifty-sixth, Fifty-seventh, and Fifty-eighth Congresses and served from March 4, 1899, until his resignation, effective March 4, 1903, before the commencement of the Fifty-eighth Congress, to become Senator. He was elected to the U.S. Senate and served from March 4, 1903, to March 3, 1909; he was an unsuccessful candidate for renomination in 1908.

While in the Senate, he was chairman of the Committee on the University of the United States (Fifty-eighth and Fifty-ninth Congresses) and a member of the Committee on the Census (Fifty-ninth and Sixtieth Congresses).

He moved to Wichita in 1911 and continued the practice of law, and was chairman of the commission to revise the general statutes of Kansas from 1921 to 1923. He moved to Washington, D.C., in 1925 and continued the practice of law, and from 1925 to 1926 was the president of the American Bar Association. He died in Washington in 1934; interment was in Old Mission Cemetery, Wichita.

References

1860 births
1934 deaths
Kansas state senators
Presidents of the American Bar Association
Republican Party United States senators from Kansas
Republican Party members of the United States House of Representatives from Kansas
People from Daviess County, Missouri
People from Paola, Kansas
People from Medicine Lodge, Kansas
People from Perry County, Pennsylvania
Washington, D.C., Republicans